The 2000–01 Pittsburgh Penguins season was the team's 34th in the National Hockey League. The team played 82 games under new head coach Ivan Hlinka, who replaced Herb Brooks, who stepped down to remain a scout with the team. The Penguins' .585 points percentage meant that they were the only NHL team from the 1990–91 season to this one that had a points percentage above .500 every season.

The last remaining active member of the 2000–01 Pittsburgh Penguins was right wing Jaromir Jagr, who played his final NHL game in the 2017–18 season, although he missed the 2008–09, 2009–10, and 2010–11 seasons. His career is still going on as a member of the Czech Extraliga's Rytiri Kladno.

Offseason
Herb Brooks resigned as head coach at the end of the previous season, but remained with the team as a scout. Ivan Hlinka succeeded Brooks as head coach. Former Penguin Joe Mullen became an assistant coach along with his former teammate Randy Hillier.

Regular season
The Penguins opened the regular season by splitting a two-game series against the Nashville Predators in Japan.

On December 9, 2000, it was announced by owner Mario Lemieux that he intended to come back as a player. Lemieux returned to the ice on December 27, 2000.  Prior to the game, his number 66 banner was lowered from the rafters of the Mellon Arena with son Austin watching. Lemieux scored a goal and set up two others (including one on his first shift) in the Penguins' 5–0 victory over the Toronto Maple Leafs. Prior to Lemieux's return, the Penguins were 15–14–6–1. After his comeback, the Penguins went 27–14–3–2 for a regular season record of 42–28–9–3 and a third-place finish in the Atlantic Division for a playoff spot. The Penguins were shut out only once all year, on October 28 against the New Jersey Devils. Only New Jersey scored more goals than Pittsburgh during the regular season. Jaromir Jagr had a stellar year, leading the team in goals (52), assists (69) and points (121). Alexei Kovalev had a career year, finishing with 44 goals and 51 assists for 95 points. Martin Straka finished second on the team in assists (68) and had 27 goals for 95 points, while Robert Lang had 32 goals and 48 assists for 80 points. In just 43 games, Lemieux had 35 goals and 41 assists for 76 points.

Final standings

Schedule and results

|-  style="background:#fcf;"
| 1 || 7 || Nashville Predators || 3–1 || Pittsburgh Penguins || 0–1–0–0 || 0
|-  style="background:#cfc;"
| 2 || 8 || Pittsburgh Penguins || 3–1 || Nashville Predators || 1–1–0–0 || 2
|-  style="background:#cfc;"
| 3 || 13 || Tampa Bay Lightning || 2–3 || Pittsburgh Penguins || 2–1–0–0 || 4
|-  style="background:#cfc;"
| 4 || 14 || New York Rangers || 6–8 || Pittsburgh Penguins || 3–1–0–0 || 6
|-  style="background:#fcf;"
| 5 || 18 || Carolina Hurricanes || 3–2 || Pittsburgh Penguins || 3–2–0–0 || 6
|-  style="background:#fff;"
| 6 || 19 || Pittsburgh Penguins || 3–3 || Ottawa Senators || 3–2–1–0 || 7
|-  style="background:#cfc;"
| 7 || 21 || Columbus Blue Jackets || 2–5 || Pittsburgh Penguins || 4–2–1–0 || 9
|-  style="background:#fcf;"
| 8 || 25 || Ottawa Senators || 3–2 || Pittsburgh Penguins || 4–3–1–0 || 9
|-  style="background:#cfc;"
| 9 || 27 || Pittsburgh Penguins || 4–1 || New York Rangers || 5–3–1–0 || 11
|-  style="background:#fcf;"
| 10 || 28 || New Jersey Devils || 9–0 || Pittsburgh Penguins || 5–4–1–0 || 11
|-

|-  style="background:#fcf;"
| 11 || 1 || Pittsburgh Penguins || 2–3 || San Jose Sharks || 5–5–1–0 || 11
|-  style="background:#cfc;"
| 12 || 3 || Pittsburgh Penguins || 4–2 || Vancouver Canucks || 6–5–1–0 || 13
|-  style="background:#fff;"
| 13 || 4 || Pittsburgh Penguins || 1–1 || Calgary Flames || 6–5–2–0 || 14
|-  style="background:#cfc;"
| 14 || 8 || Philadelphia Flyers || 2–5 || Pittsburgh Penguins || 7–5–2–0 || 16
|-  style="background:#cfc;"
| 15 || 10 || Pittsburgh Penguins || 4–2 || New Jersey Devils || 8–5–2–0 || 18
|-  style="background:#cfc;"
| 16 || 11 || Edmonton Oilers || 2–5 || Pittsburgh Penguins || 9–5–2–0 || 20
|-  style="background:#ffc;"
| 17 || 13 || Pittsburgh Penguins || 2–3 OT || Colorado Avalanche || 9–5–2–1 || 21
|-  style="background:#fcf;"
| 18 || 16 || Pittsburgh Penguins || 3–4 || St. Louis Blues || 9–6–2–1 || 21
|-  style="background:#cfc;"
| 19 || 18 || Atlanta Thrashers || 1–3 || Pittsburgh Penguins || 10–6–2–1 || 23
|-  style="background:#fcf;"
| 20 || 22 || Carolina Hurricanes || 3–1 || Pittsburgh Penguins || 10–7–2–1 || 23
|-  style="background:#cfc;"
| 21 || 24 || Pittsburgh Penguins || 1–0 || Philadelphia Flyers || 11–7–2–1 || 25
|-  style="background:#fff;"
| 22 || 25 || Los Angeles Kings || 2–2 || Pittsburgh Penguins || 11–7–3–1 || 26
|-  style="background:#fcf;"
| 23 || 28 || Pittsburgh Penguins || 1–3 || Boston Bruins || 11–8–3–1 || 26
|-

|-  style="background:#cfc;"
| 24 || 1 || Pittsburgh Penguins || 6–4 || Buffalo Sabres || 12–8–3–1 || 28
|-  style="background:#fcf;"
| 25 || 2 || Buffalo Sabres || 3–2 || Pittsburgh Penguins || 12–9–3–1 || 28
|-  style="background:#cfc;"
| 26 || 5 || Pittsburgh Penguins || 4–2 || Ottawa Senators || 13–9–3–1 || 30
|-  style="background:#fcf;"
| 27 || 6 || Boston Bruins || 3–2 || Pittsburgh Penguins || 13–10–3–1 || 30
|-  style="background:#fcf;"
| 28 || 9 || Pittsburgh Penguins || 1–5 || Toronto Maple Leafs || 13–11–3–1 || 30
|-  style="background:#cfc;"
| 29 || 10 || Pittsburgh Penguins || 4–3 || Detroit Red Wings || 14–11–3–1 || 32
|-  style="background:#fcf;"
| 30 || 13 || Toronto Maple Leafs || 7–4 || Pittsburgh Penguins || 14–12–3–1 || 32
|-  style="background:#fcf;"
| 31 || 15 || Florida Panthers || 4–1 || Pittsburgh Penguins || 14–13–3–1 || 32
|-  style="background:#fff;"
| 32 || 16 || Pittsburgh Penguins || 4–4 || Montreal Canadiens || 14–13–4–1 || 33
|-  style="background:#fff;"
| 33 || 20 || Pittsburgh Penguins || 2–2 || Florida Panthers || 14–13–5–1 || 34
|-  style="background:#fff;"
| 34 || 21 || Pittsburgh Penguins || 1–1 || Tampa Bay Lightning || 14–13–6–1 || 35
|-  style="background:#fcf;"
| 35 || 23 || Dallas Stars || 8–2 || Pittsburgh Penguins || 14–14–6–1 || 35
|-  style="background:#cfc;"
| 36 || 26 || Pittsburgh Penguins || 5–3 || Buffalo Sabres || 15–14–6–1 || 37
|-  style="background:#cfc;"
| 37 || 27 || Toronto Maple Leafs || 0–5 || Pittsburgh Penguins || 16–14–6–1 || 39
|-  style="background:#cfc;"
| 38 || 30 || Ottawa Senators || 3–5 || Pittsburgh Penguins || 17–14–6–1 || 41
|-

|-  style="background:#cfc;"
| 39 || 3 || Washington Capitals || 2–3 || Pittsburgh Penguins || 18–14–6–1 || 43
|-  style="background:#fcf;"
| 40 || 5 || Montreal Canadiens || 4–3 || Pittsburgh Penguins || 18–15–6–1 || 43
|-  style="background:#cfc;"
| 41 || 8 || Pittsburgh Penguins || 5–3 || Washington Capitals || 19–15–6–1 || 45
|-  style="background:#fcf;"
| 42 || 9 || Pittsburgh Penguins || 2–5 || Boston Bruins || 19–16–6–1 || 45
|-  style="background:#cfc;"
| 43 || 12 || New York Islanders || 3–4 || Pittsburgh Penguins || 20–16–6–1 || 47
|-  style="background:#fcf;"
| 44 || 13 || Pittsburgh Penguins || 5–6 || New York Islanders || 20–17–6–1 || 47
|-  style="background:#cfc;"
| 45 || 15 || Mighty Ducks of Anaheim || 2–3 || Pittsburgh Penguins || 21–17–6–1 || 49
|-  style="background:#fcf;"
| 46 || 17 || Pittsburgh Penguins || 4–5 || Phoenix Coyotes || 21–18–6–1 || 49
|-  style="background:#ffc;"
| 47 || 19 || Pittsburgh Penguins || 5–6 OT || Dallas Stars || 21–18–6–2 || 50
|-  style="background:#cfc;"
| 48 || 21 || Pittsburgh Penguins || 4–0 || Chicago Blackhawks || 22–18–6–2 || 52
|-  style="background:#cfc;"
| 49 || 24 || Montreal Canadiens || 1–3 || Pittsburgh Penguins || 23–18–6–2 || 54
|-  style="background:#cfc;"
| 50 || 27 || Atlanta Thrashers || 1–5 || Pittsburgh Penguins || 24–18–6–2 || 56
|-  style="background:#cfc;"
| 51 || 30 || Pittsburgh Penguins || 6–3 || Atlanta Thrashers || 25–18–6–2 || 58
|-  style="background:#fcf;"
| 52 || 31 || Philadelphia Flyers || 5–1 || Pittsburgh Penguins || 25–19–6–2 || 58
|-

|-  style="background:#cfc;"
| 53 || 7 || Philadelphia Flyers || 4–9 || Pittsburgh Penguins || 26–19–6–2 || 60
|-  style="background:#cfc;"
| 54 || 10 || New Jersey Devils || 4–5 OT || Pittsburgh Penguins || 27–19–6–2 || 62
|-  style="background:#fcf;"
| 55 || 11 || Pittsburgh Penguins || 2–4 || Minnesota Wild || 27–20–6–2 || 62
|-  style="background:#cfc;"
| 56 || 14 || Minnesota Wild || 1–2 || Pittsburgh Penguins || 28–20–6–2 || 64
|-  style="background:#fff;"
| 57 || 16 || Pittsburgh Penguins || 4–4 || New Jersey Devils || 28–20–7–2 || 65
|-  style="background:#cfc;"
| 58 || 17 || Pittsburgh Penguins || 3–2 OT || Columbus Blue Jackets || 29–20–7–2 || 67
|-  style="background:#fcf;"
| 59 || 19 || Colorado Avalanche || 5–1 || Pittsburgh Penguins || 29–21–7–2 || 67
|-  style="background:#cfc;"
| 60 || 21 || Florida Panthers || 2–3 OT || Pittsburgh Penguins || 30–21–7–2 || 69
|-  style="background:#cfc;"
| 61 || 23 || New York Rangers || 4–6 || Pittsburgh Penguins || 31–21–7–2 || 71
|-  style="background:#cfc;"
| 62 || 25 || New York Islanders || 1–6 || Pittsburgh Penguins || 32–21–7–2 || 73
|-  style="background:#fcf;"
| 63 || 28 || Pittsburgh Penguins || 2–4 || Montreal Canadiens || 32–22–7–2 || 73
|-

|-  style="background:#cfc;"
| 64 || 2 || Pittsburgh Penguins || 7–5 || New York Rangers || 33–22–7–2 || 75
|-  style="background:#fcf;"
| 65 || 3 || Pittsburgh Penguins || 3–4 || Washington Capitals || 33–23–7–2 || 75
|-  style="background:#fcf;"
| 66 || 7 || Washington Capitals || 4–3 || Pittsburgh Penguins || 33–24–7–2 || 75
|-  style="background:#cfc;"
| 67 || 8 || Pittsburgh Penguins || 5–3 || Atlanta Thrashers || 34–24–7–2 || 77
|-  style="background:#cfc;"
| 68 || 10 || Calgary Flames || 3–6 || Pittsburgh Penguins || 35–24–7–2 || 79
|-  style="background:#fff;"
| 69 || 12 || Pittsburgh Penguins || 3–3 || New York Rangers || 35–24–8–2 || 80
|-  style="background:#fcf;"
| 70 || 14 || New York Islanders || 3–1 || Pittsburgh Penguins || 35–25–8–2 || 80
|-  style="background:#cfc;"
| 71 || 16 || Pittsburgh Penguins || 6–3 || Florida Panthers || 36–25–8–2 || 82
|-  style="background:#fcf;"
| 72 || 17 || Pittsburgh Penguins || 1–5 || Tampa Bay Lightning || 36–26–8–2 || 82
|-  style="background:#fff;"
| 73 || 20 || Boston Bruins || 2–2 || Pittsburgh Penguins || 36–26–9–2 || 83
|-  style="background:#fcf;"
| 74 || 23 || Pittsburgh Penguins || 3–5 || Carolina Hurricanes || 36–27–9–2 || 83
|-  style="background:#cfc;"
| 75 || 25 || Pittsburgh Penguins || 4–2 || New Jersey Devils || 37–27–9–2 || 85
|-  style="background:#cfc;"
| 76 || 27 || Buffalo Sabres || 1–4 || Pittsburgh Penguins || 38–27–9–2 || 87
|-  style="background:#cfc;"
| 77 || 29 || Chicago Blackhawks || 2–5 || Pittsburgh Penguins || 39–27–9–2 || 89
|-  style="background:#cfc;"
| 78 || 31 || St. Louis Blues || 3–5 || Pittsburgh Penguins || 40–27–9–2 || 91
|-

|-  style="background:#fcf;"
| 79 || 2 || Pittsburgh Penguins || 1–4 || New York Islanders || 40–28–9–2 || 91
|-  style="background:#cfc;"
| 80 || 4 || Tampa Bay Lightning || 2–4 || Pittsburgh Penguins || 41–28–9–2 || 93
|-  style="background:#ffc;"
| 81 || 7 || Pittsburgh Penguins || 3–4 OT || Philadelphia Flyers || 41–28–9–3 || 94
|-  style="background:#cfc;"
| 82 || 8 || Pittsburgh Penguins || 6–4 || Carolina Hurricanes || 42–28–9–3 || 96
|-

|- style="text-align:center;"
| Legend:       = Win       = Loss       = OT Loss       = Tie

Injuries

Playoffs

Eastern Conference Quarterfinals
The Penguins opened the playoffs against the Washington Capitals. It was their sixth meeting in the playoffs. The Penguins were shut out in Game 1, 1–0. Lemieux scored a goal and had an assist in Game 2, which was won by the Penguins, 2–1. Newcomer Johan Hedberg shut out the Capitals in Game 3. The Capitals won Game 4 in overtime, 4-3. However, game-winning goals by Lemieux and Martin Straka in Game 5 and 6 won the series for the Penguins, 4–2.

Eastern Conference semifinals
The Penguins played the Buffalo Sabres in the conference semi-finals.  The Penguins won Game 1 by the score of 3–0 and Game 2 by the score of 3–1. The Sabres won the next three games, pushing the Penguins to elimination. However, overtime-winning goals by Straka and Darius Kasparaitis in Game 6 and 7 won the series for the Penguins. Game 7 was Dominik Hasek's last game as a Sabre; he would sign with the Detroit Red Wings in the off-season.

Eastern Conference finals
The Penguins and the New Jersey Devils split the first two games of the series before the Devils took games three, four, and five to eliminate the Penguins.

Player statistics
Skaters

Goaltenders

†Denotes player spent time with another team before joining the Penguins.  Stats reflect time with the Penguins only.
‡Denotes player was traded mid-season.  Stats reflect time with the Penguins only.

Awards and records

Milestones

Making their NHL Regular Season debuts in 2000–01 were Roman Simicek, Toby Petersen, Billy Tibbetts, Greg Crozier, Milan Kraft and Johan Hedberg.

Awards

Broadcaster Mike Lange was also awarded the Foster Hewitt Memorial Award in 2001, thus securing his induction into the broadcaster's wing of the Hockey Hall of Fame.

Jaromir Jagr, Alexei Kovalev and Mario Lemieux were all selected to participate in the 2001 NHL All-Star Game. Lemieux captained the North American All-Stars and scored two points.  Kovalev was a reserve for the World All-Stars and also scored two points. Jagr was voted as a starter for the World All-Stars, but could not play due to an injury.

Transactions
The Penguins were involved in the following transactions during the 2000–01 season:

Trades

Free agents acquired

Free agents lost

Player signings

Draft picks
The Penguins selected the following players at the 2000 NHL Entry Draft at the Pengrowth Saddledome in Calgary:

Draft notes
 The Pittsburgh Penguins' fourth-round pick went to the Montreal Canadiens as the result of a June 24, 2000 trade that sent a 2000 fourth-round pick and a 2000 fifth-round pick to the Penguins in exchange for this pick.
  The Montreal Canadiens' fourth-round pick (from the Mighty Ducks of Anaheim) went to the Pittsburgh Penguins as a result of a June 24, 2000 trade that sent a 2000 fourth-round pick to the Canadiens in exchange for a 2000 fifth-round pick and this pick.
  The Montreal Canadiens' fifth-round pick went to the Pittsburgh Penguins as a result of a June 24, 2000 trade that sent a 2000 fourth-round pick to the Canadiens in exchange for a 2000 fourth-round pick and this pick.
 The Pittsburgh Penguins' fifth-round pick went to the Mighty Ducks of Anaheim as the result of a March 14, 2000 trade that sent Dan Trebil to the Penguins in exchange for this pick.
  The Mighty Ducks of Anaheim's ninth-round pick went to the Pittsburgh Penguins as a result of a January 29, 2000 trade that sent Kip Miller to the Mighty Ducks in exchange for this pick.

Farm teams
The Wilkes-Barre/Scranton Penguins of the AHL finished second in the Mid-Atlantic Division with a record of 36-33-9-2 record.  They defeated the Syracuse Crunch, Philadelphia Phantoms and Hershey Bears to win the Robert W. Clarke Trophy as Western Conference playoff champions.  They lost to the Saint John Flames in six games in the Calder Cup Finals.  John Slaney won the Eddie Shore Award as defenseman of the year.

The ECHL's Wheeling Nailers finished last overall with a record of 24-40-8.

See also
2000–01 NHL season

References
 

Pitts
Pitts
Pittsburgh Penguins seasons
Pitts
Pitts